Piedmont Community College is a public community college in Roxboro, North Carolina. It is part of the North Carolina Community College System. Its service area includes two North Carolina counties: Person County, where its main campus is located in Roxboro; and Caswell County, with a campus in Yanceyville. Piedmont CC serves over 10,000 people annually through its curriculum programs leading to degrees, diplomas, and certificates.

History 
Piedmont Community College was established on July 1, 1970. The original name was Person County Technical Institute.

The college expanded to include Caswell County, effective July 1, 1985. The Caswell County Campus opened in 1987.

Presidents 
 Craven H. Sumerell, 1970–1973
 Edward W. Cox, 1973–1987
 H. James Owen, 1987 - June 2009
 Walter C. Bartlett, July 2009 – July 2017
 Pamela G. Senegal, July 2017 – present

Academics 
The college awards associates degrees, diplomas, and certificates in over thirty-five programs of study in the fields of science, technology, engineering, mathematics as well as fine arts and technical areas. It also offers a college-university transfer program for students who want to pursue bachelor's degrees at four-year institutions. High school students also receive college-level instruction through special programs prescribed by the NC General Assembly.

Piedmont Community College is accredited by the Commission on Colleges of the Southern Association of Colleges and Schools to award associate degrees, diplomas and certificates. In addition to this institutional accreditation, many individual programs have accreditation or licensing board criteria.

Campuses

Main Campus 
The main campus is located at 1715 College Drive, in Roxboro near Northern Middle School. It consists of 13 buildings, most of which contain classrooms and faculty offices. Other buildings include Student Services, Bookstore, Learning Resource Center, and a Child Care Facility.

Business Development & Entrepreneurship Center 
The business development center is located in uptown Roxboro. It provides business counseling and shared services for businesses in the early stages of development.

Caswell Campus 
The Caswell campus is located at 331 Piedmont Drive, in Yanceyville off NC 62.

External links 
 Official website

Two-year colleges in the United States
North Carolina Community College System colleges
Educational institutions established in 1970
Universities and colleges accredited by the Southern Association of Colleges and Schools
Education in Person County, North Carolina
Education in Caswell County, North Carolina
Buildings and structures in Person County, North Carolina
Buildings and structures in Caswell County, North Carolina